Teodoro Esteban López Calderón (born 3 May 1954) is a Spanish Navy Admiral General who serves as the 12th and current Chief of the Defence Staff of the Spanish Armed Forces since 27 January 2021. Previously, he served as Admiral Chief of Staff of the Navy from 2017 and 2021.

Biography
López Calderón was born in 1954 in the city of Cartagena and joined the Spanish Navy after graduating at the Escuela Naval Militar in 1973. He is a specialist in electronics, tactics and weapons systems. He also completed various courses locally and abroad, such as the Senior Course at the NATO Defense College, the Navy General Staff Course, Electronics Expert courses, and the Tactical Action Office course.

Throughout his naval career, he held the command of the Villaamil (P-04) patrol vessel, the 2nd Minesweeper Squadron , the frigate Cataluña (F73), the 41st Escort Squadron (Frigates), and the Naval Action Group 2. During the latter, López Calderón took part in Operation Active Endeavor, as the 2nd Group included the Spanish surface ships that were assigned to the mission. He also served on various ships of the Spanish Navy, such as the Descubierta (F31), the Asturias (F74), the Extremadura (F75), and the Numancia (F83).

He also served as the Chief of Staff of the 21st Escort Squadron and as a Staff member of the "Delta" Group, a task group in charge of monitoring the maritime borders of the Basque Country to prevent weapons smuggling and against the clandestine trafficking of terrorist related operations. He also served at the U.S. Naval Forces Southern Command on 1997, and the Standing NATO Maritime Group 2, and as the Chief of the General Staff for Operations and Deputy Chief of the General Staff at the Operations Command. He also served as the President of the Spanish Section of the Hispano-North American Standing Committee, and also served at the Headquarters of the Strategic Plans Section of the Plans Division of the Navy General Staff and Operations of the Naval Operational Command Staff. From 1987 to 1996 he served as an elective member of the Electronic Warfare Doctrine Board of the Navy.

He also served a technical adviser to the Minister of Defense and head of the Navy General Staff's strategic planning section. López Calderón also served as the Chief of the General Staff for Operations and Deputy Chief of the General Staff at the Operations Command on the Defence Staff.

He was appointed by the Council of Ministers as the replacement of Admiral General Jaime Muńoz-Delgado on 31 March 2017 as the new Chief of Staff of the Navy. In January 2021, after the resignation of JEMAD Miguel Ángel Villarroya, he was appointed as the 12th Chief of Staff of the Spanish Armed Forces.

Awards and decorations

  Grand Cross of Naval Merit 
  Grand Cross of the Order of Merit of the Civil Guard
  Grand Cross of the Royal and Military Order of San Hermenegildo
  Commander with Star of the Royal and Military Order of San Hermenegildo
  Commander of the Royal and Military Order of San Hermenegildo
  Cross of the Royal and Military Order of San Hermenegildo
  Cross of Military Merit
  Cross of Naval Merit
  Cross of the Order Guard Merit of the Civil Guard
  Cross of the Order Police Merit

  Officer of the Order of Australia – 3 May 2022 – For distinguished service in strengthening the defence relationship between Australia and Spain through personal commitment, engagement and support to Australia.

  Chevalier of the Order of National Merit of the French Republic

  NATO Meritorious Service Medal
  Article 5 Medal for Operation Active Endeavor

  Meritorious Service Medal

Personal life
He is married with five children and also has two grandchildren. He can speak fluent English along with his native Spanish.

References

1954 births
Living people
Chiefs of Staff of the Navy (Spain)
Chiefs of the Defence Staff (Spain)
Military personnel from Cartagena, Spain
Spanish admirals
Spanish naval officers
Honorary Officers of the Order of Australia